Metomen is an unincorporated community in the town of Metomen, Fond du Lac County, Wisconsin, United States. The community is located on Brandon Road.

History
In 1873, the post office and railroad depot were moved to the community of Metomen from Reeds Corners, Wisconsin. Metomen had no businesses, factories, or stores.

Notes

Unincorporated communities in Fond du Lac County, Wisconsin
Unincorporated communities in Wisconsin